The 1996 season was the fifth full year of competitive football in the Baltic country as an independent nation. After having a poor run in 1995 (twelve defeats in twelve games) the Estonia national football team started in the qualifying tournament for the 1998 FIFA World Cup in France. The team had a new coach: Teitur Thordarson from Iceland.

Estonia vs Azerbaijan

Cyprus vs Estonia

Estonia vs Faroe Islands

Estonia vs Iceland

Estonia vs Turkey

Estonia vs Latvia

Estonia vs Lithuania

Belarus vs Estonia

Estonia vs Belarus

Estonia vs Scotland

Finland vs Estonia

Andorra vs Estonia

Estonia vs Indonesia

Basque Country vs Estonia

Estonia played the non-FIFA Basque Country team on 26 December 1996; this did not contribute to ranking points or individual cap totals.

Notes

References
 RSSSF detailed results
 RSSSF detailed results
 RSSSF detailed results
 RSSSF detailed results

1996
1996 national football team results
National